Fabian Böhm (born 24 June 1989) is a German handball player for TSV Hannover-Burgdorf and the German national team.

He participated at the 2019 World Men's Handball Championship.

References

External links

1989 births
Living people
German male handball players
Sportspeople from Potsdam
Handball-Bundesliga players
Füchse Berlin Reinickendorf HBC players